United Nations Security Council resolution 492, adopted unanimously on 10 November 1981, after examining the application of Antigua and Barbuda for membership in the United Nations, the Council recommended to the General Assembly that Antigua and Barbuda be admitted.

See also
 Member states of the United Nations
 List of United Nations Security Council Resolutions 401 to 500 (1976–1982)

References
Text of the Resolution at undocs.org

External links
 

 0492
 0492
 0492
November 1981 events
1981 in Antigua and Barbuda